Catalina Devandas Aguilar is a Costa Rican lawyer who served as the first United Nations Special Rapporteur on the Rights of Persons with Disabilities from 2014 until 2020. She currently serves as Permanent Representative of Costa Rica to the United Nations at Geneva. Previously, she worked for the World Bank and took part in the establishment of the Convention on the Rights of Persons with Disabilities with the United Nations Secretariat. She has spina bifida and uses a wheelchair.

Career
Devandas-Aguilar began her career as an attorney in 1993, working as lawyer until 1999.

She has previously consulted for the World Bank and was part of the United Nations Secretariat that established the Convention on the Rights of Persons with Disabilities. In 2009, Ms. Devandas Aguilar began working for the Disability Rights Advocacy Fund and the Disability Rights Fund. In 2014, Aguilar was named the first United Nations Special Rapporteur on the Rights of Persons with Disabilities. 

During her time as Special Rapporteur, she traveled to multiple countries to determine the conditions of people with disabilities. In 2016, Ms. Devandas Aguilar analyzed the status of people with disabilities in Zambia. After her visit, she recommended that Zambia should invest in disability rights and prevent violence against people with disabilities.

In 2017, she became the first member of the United Nations to be granted a visit to North Korea. After her trip to North Korea, she reported that she was prevented from meeting with several North Korean ministries. Her recommendations to North Korea included the stoppage of discriminatory language against North Koreans with disabilities and the creation of more accessible methods for deaf and blind North Koreans.

She was also one of the experts appointed by the World Health Organization for training on human rights in mental health, Quality Rights 2019.

Visit to France 
From October 3 to 17, 2017, Devandas-Aguilar visited France and submitted a report before the United Nations, in relation to the situation in relation to respect for human rights.

References

Living people
United Nations special rapporteurs
Year of birth missing (living people)
Place of birth missing (living people)
Costa Rican women diplomats
Costa Rican disability rights activists
Costa Rican women activists
Consultants
Costa Rican officials of the United Nations
Costa Rican women lawyers
20th-century Costa Rican lawyers
20th-century women lawyers
21st-century diplomats
People with spina bifida